Liu Pok is a village in Sheung Shui, North District, Hong Kong.

Administration
Liu Pok is a recognized village under the New Territories Small House Policy. It is one of the villages represented within the Sheung Shui District Rural Committee. For electoral purposes, Liu Pok is part of the Sheung Shui Rural constituency, which is currently represented by Simon Hau Fuk-tat.

History
At the time of the 1911 census, the population of Liu Pok was 237. The number of males was 136.

References

Villages in North District, Hong Kong
Sheung Shui